The Barinas Municipality is one of the 12 municipalities (municipios) that make up the Venezuelan state of Barinas.  The town of Barinas is the shire town of the Barinas Municipality.

Demographics
The Barinas Municipality, according to the 2011 census by the National Institute of Statistics of Venezuela, the municipality has a population of 358,851.

Government
The mayor of the Barinas Municipality is Julio César Reyes, re-elected on October 31, 2004, with 90% of the vote.  The municipality is divided into 14 parishes; Barinas, Alfredo Arvelo Larriva, San Silvestre, Santa Inés, Santa Lucía, Torunos, El Carmen, Rómulo Betancourt, Corazón de Jesús, Ramón Ignacio Méndez, Alto Barinas, Manuel Palacio Fajardo, Juan Antonio Rodríguez Domínguez, and Dominga Ortiz de Páez.

See also
Barinas, Barinas
Barinas (state)
Municipalities of Venezuela

References

External links
 barinas-barinas.gob.ve  

Municipalities of Barinas (state)
Barinas, Venezuela